Đông Hải is a rural district (huyện) of Bạc Liêu province in the Mekong Delta region of Vietnam. As of 2003 the district had a population of 130,557. The district covers an area of 550 km2. The district capital lies at Gành Hào.

References

Districts of Bạc Liêu province